Dongchong may refer to:

 Tung Chung, in the north of Lantau Island, Hong Kong
 Tung Chung line of the Hong Kong MTR
 Tung Chung station on said line
 Dongchong, Guangzhou, town in and subdivision of Nansha District, Guangzhou, Guangdong
 Dongchong station on Guangzhou Metro Line 4
 , town in and subdivision of Chengqu, Shanwei, Guangdong